Rishel Covered Bridge is a historic wooden covered bridge located at East Chillisquaque Township and West Chillisquaque Township in Northumberland County, Pennsylvania. It is a single span, Burr Truss bridge, constructed in 1830. It crosses the Chillisquaque Creek.  It may be the oldest covered wooden bridge in the United States.

It was listed on the National Register of Historic Places in 1979.

References 

Covered bridges on the National Register of Historic Places in Pennsylvania
Covered bridges in Northumberland County, Pennsylvania
Bridges completed in 1830
Wooden bridges in Pennsylvania
Bridges in Northumberland County, Pennsylvania
1830 establishments in Pennsylvania
National Register of Historic Places in Northumberland County, Pennsylvania
Road bridges on the National Register of Historic Places in Pennsylvania
Burr Truss bridges in the United States